Felix the Cat is an American animated television series featuring the cartoon character of the same name.

Like The Van Beuren Corporation before, Joe Oriolo gave Felix a more domesticated and pedestrian personality, geared more toward children, and introduced Felix's now-famous item of the "Magic Bag of Tricks", a satchel that can assume the shape and characteristics of anything Felix wants, and several new main characters such as Felix's arch-enemy, The Professor and his bulldog sidekick Rock Bottom. The cartoons are divided into two parts, with the first part ending in a cliffhanger resolved after a commercial break.

A second Felix series, The Twisted Tales of Felix the Cat, aired on CBS in 1995–1997.

Background
In 1954, Otto Messmer retired from the Felix daily newspaper strips, and his assistant Joe Oriolo (the co-creator of Casper the Friendly Ghost) took over.  Oriolo struck a deal with Felix's new owner to begin a new series of Felix cartoons for television. Oriolo starred Felix in 130 two part stories  or total of 260 television cartoons produced by Paramount Cartoon Studios, and distributed by Trans-Lux.
The made for TV Felix the Cat cartoons either went on the air on October 2, 1958 about 65 years ago or in 1959.  It is unknown when his show had its final episode. 

The show did away with Felix's previous supporting cast and introduced many new characters. These characters were performed by voice actor Jack Mercer. Oriolo's plots revolve around the unsuccessful attempts of the antagonists to steal Felix's Magic Bag, though in an unusual twist, these antagonists are occasionally depicted as Felix's friends as well. While the cartoons were a ratings success, critics have dismissed them as paling in comparison to the earlier Sullivan-Messmer works. Oriolo aimed the cartoons at children. The series used limited animation (owing to a limited budget) and simplistic storylines.

This TV series also helped introduce the character of Felix the Cat to audiences in Japan.  A Japanese language dub of the series aired on NHK in 1960 and was rerun three years later on Fuji TV.  Four decades later, Felix would be the star of his own anime series.

Characters
 Felix the Cat  The main character and star of the show. He has many adventures with his little magic bag of tricks that often helps in dangerous situations. Two different patterns were used for the magic bag,  one is the earlier version pattern that is a dot and cross pattern.  The latter series bag was a houndstooth pattern that replaced the dot and cross.  All the episodes having the houndstooth pattern are missing from the market place.  No matter what the situation, he almost always ends up laughing. A few of the episodes end with Felix on the losing end without the laughter, or his other signature line, "Righty-o!", before he starts laughing.

 The Professor  He is Felix's archenemy or foil and, in most appearances, is trying to seize the Magic Bag of Tricks. He has a very amusing speech impediment and is quite eccentric. He is depicted as a mad scientist, very intelligent, yet very obsessed. He attempts many tricks such as the use of his inventions and many disguises to get Felix's magic bag, but always winds up failing in the end. In some episodes where his nephew Poindexter is involved, the Professor becomes a reluctant ally of Felix, particularly when they battle the Master Cylinder. In some of the episodes, when the professor gives up on his episodic schemes, he intones with the words: "Oh, what's the use!!!!!"

   He is the nerdy young nephew of the Professor and the best friend and sidekick of Felix. He is depicted as a stereotypical scientist; he is very intelligent and always wears thick Coke-bottle glasses, a lab coat, and a mortarboard.  A button on the chest of his lab coat acts as a control for whatever device the plot calls for. Despite the Professor being his uncle, he is also one of Felix's best friends. Whenever he talks to Felix, he refers to him as "Mr. Felix". Felix sometimes refers Poindexter as "Poinsy".

 Rock Bottom  The Professor's bumbling sidekick (a bulldog who walks and dresses like a human being) who tries to help the Professor steal Felix's Magic Bag. Rock Bottom's full name is Rock Bottom Age. He occasionally works for Master Cylinder. Like the Professor, in some of the episodes, when Rock Bottom's schemes fail, he intones with the words: "Oh, what's the use!!!!!"

 Master Cylinder  An evil, cylindrical robot who first appeared in the 1958 episode "Master Cylinder-King of the Moon". He is always trying to kidnap Poindexter so that he can use his intellect to build weapons and equipment. It is revealed that he was once a pupil of the Professor at an academy until an explosion destroyed his original body.

 Martin the Martian  The good Martian who always helps Felix and his friends whenever they are in a space jam.

 General Clang  The evil general in space who also wants the rocket formula in order to destroy the Earth,

 Vavoom  A small, unassuming and friendly Inuit whose only vocalization is a (literally) Earth-shattering shout of his own name "VAVOOM!" (but who is powerless if his mouth was taped shut). He first appeared in "Felix and Vavoom".

Theme song
The program is also remembered for its distinctive theme song. It was written by Winston Sharples and performed by 1950s big band singer Ann Bennett.

In the 1970s, when the show was picked up by Broadway Video, a new theme song was written and recorded.

Episodes

Series overview

Season 1 (1958–59)

Season 2 (1960)

Home media
Eight episodes were released on VHS by Media Home Entertainment. In 2001, Golden Books Family Entertainment and Sony Wonder released a "Collector's Edition" DVD featuring ten episodes from the first season. This DVD was eventually reissued by Classic Media and Genius Products in 2006 and by DreamWorks Animation in 2014, under the title "Mischief and Mayhem". On October 2, 2007, Classic Media and Genius Products released the entire first season on DVD under the title "Felix the Cat: Golden Anniversary Edition".

Notes

External links
 
 Cartoon list at the Big Cartoon DataBase

Felix the Cat television series
1950s American animated television series
1960s American animated television series
1958 American television series debuts
1960 American television series endings
American children's animated comedy television series
Animated television series about cats
English-language television shows
Famous Studios series and characters
First-run syndicated television programs in the United States
Television series by Famous Studios